Curry-Moylough is a Gaelic Athletic Association club based along the Sligo-Mayo border comprising the parish of Curry and Moylough  in County Sligo, Republic of Ireland.

The placename in Irish is "An Choraidh" which translates as "the weir, stone-fence or ford".

Notable players
Red Óg Murphy

Honours
 Sligo Senior Football Championship: (7)
 1889, 1922, 1964, 1972, 2003, 2006, 2012
 Sligo Intermediate Football Championship: (2)
 1980, 2020
 Sligo Junior Football Championship: (2)
 1955, 2011
 Sligo Junior B Football Championship: (3)
 1997, 2001, 2021
 Sligo Under 20 Football Championship: (3) 
 1996, 2004, 2005
 Sligo Minor Football Championship: (9)
 1930, 1991, 1995, 1996, 2001, 2007, 2008, 2009, 2012
 Sligo Under-16 Football Championship: (8)
 1955, 1956, 1957, 1963, 1964, 1972, 1994, 2007
 Sligo Under-14 Football Championship: (4)
 1963, 1992, 2005, 2006
 Sligo Senior Football League (Division 1): (7)
 1956, 1962, 1981, 1989, 1996, 2006, 2007
 Sligo Intermediate Football League Division 3 (ex Div. 2): (1)
 1980
 Sligo Intermediate Football League (Division 4): (3)
 2007, 2011, 2017
 Kiernan Cup: (1)
 1993
 Sligo Under-16 A Football League: (1)
 2017
 Sligo Minor A Football League: (1)                             • 2017

References

Gaelic games clubs in County Sligo